Rostec, officially the State Corporation for Assistance to Development, Production and Export of Advanced Technology Industrial Product Rostec and formerly Rostekhnologii (literally "Russian Technologies"), is a Russian state-owned defense conglomerate headquartered in Moscow.

Established in 2007, the organization comprises about 700 enterprises, which together form 14 holding companies: eleven in the defense-industry complex and three in civil sectors. Rostec's organizations are located in 60 constituents of the Russian Federation and supply goods to over 70 countries worldwide. The organization is headed by Sergey Chemezov, appointed to the position by Russian President Vladimir Putin.

The 2014 EU sanctions listing for Sergey Chemezov describes how Rostec subsidiaries supported Russia's annexation of Crimea.

History

On 23 November 2007, Russian President Vladimir Putin signed federal law No. 270 to establish a state corporation named Rostekhnologii, which was previously passed by the State Duma on 9 November and passed by the Federation Council on 16 November.

Later on 10 July 2008, newly elected Russian President Dmitry Medvedev signed a decree that transfers 443 struggling enterprises to the ownership under Rostekhnologii. Out of these acquired assets, 30% of such enterprises were in pre-crisis and crisis condition, 28 entities in bankruptcy proceedings, 17 had no business operations, and 27 had lost part of their assets or faced a material risk of such loss, with all facing a total debt of RUB630 billion. In addition, these enterprises had worn out fixed assets, dilapidated production chains, and poor management.

After the acquisition, structural reforms were made, helping the enterprises emerge from their financial struggles with a 20%–30% increase in production growth, five times the national average. Most of the profits were acquired by Rostekhnologii, which 80% of it was from 20% of Rostekhnologii's assets. The 20% included the titanium monopoly VSMPO-AVISMA, helicopter manufacturers Mil and Kamov, AvtoVAZ, and KamAZ. This in turn brought executives of some companies in conflict with each other, such as the case with Mil and Kamov in which they refuse to communicate with each other. As a result, Rostekhnologii had to work with the two companies so they can cooperate with each other.

On 21 December 2012, Rostekhnologii rebranded itself as Rostec to make the corporation more open to the world. Rostec also featured a new logo, an open square symbolizing a window to the world and a focus frame, as well a new slogan "Partner in development" and implemented changes in its corporate governance structure. The corporation spent $1.5 million for rebranding. The corporate brand, which was launched in late 2012, is currently one of Russia's 15 most valuable brands and has a value similar to that of major companies such as Rosneft and Rostelecom.

On 16 July 2014, as a result of Russian intervention in Ukraine and Russian annexation of Crimea, Rostec was one of the companies that was sanctioned by the Obama administration. Sergey Chemezov, current CEO of Rostec, was one of the individuals targeted by the United States (U.S.) and the European Union (E.U.), whose visa was banned and assets froze by the E.U.. Rostec's access to U.S. debt markets was also limited. Rostec was forced to rethink its strategy for its holding companies.

In December 2015, Rostec's supervisory board approved its development strategy through 2025. According to the strategy, Rostec intends to change the Russian economic model by putting less emphasis on weaponry, aviation components, and software and more emphasis on electronics, telecommunications, robotics, and other high-tech industries. This in turn would diversify the Russian economy, increasing the share of high-tech civilian products and non-primary exports.

It was reported in late 2022 that Rostec had greatly increased the production of armored vehicles and ammunition in response to the 2022 Russian invasion of Ukraine.

Rostec announced on 5 January 2023 that it will commence mass manufacture of new C-UAS EW systems in two months.

Corporate governance 

The supervisory board, the management board, and the General Director are all appointed by the President of Russia.

Supervisory board

Sergey Chemezov – General Director (CEO) of Rostec
Sergey Ivanov – Special Representative of the President of the Russian Federation on the Issues of Environmental Activities, Environment and Transport
Denis Manturov – Russian Minister of Industry and Trade
Yury Borisov – Deputy Prime Minister of Russia for Defence and Space Industry, Russian Deputy Minister of Defence
Larisa Brychyova – Aide to the President of Russia and Head of the Presidential State-Legal Directorate
Igor Levitin – Aide to the President of Russia
Anton Siluanov – Russian Minister of Finance
Vladimir Ostrovenko – Deputy Chief of the Presidential administration
Dmitry Shugaev – Director of the Federal Service for Military-Technical Cooperation

Management board 

 Sergey Chemezov – General Director (CEO)
 Vladimir Artyakov – First Deputy General Director
 Nikolay Volobuev – Deputy CEO
 Igor Zavyalov – Deputy CEO of Finance
 Aleksandr Nazarov – Deputy General Director
 Dmitry Lelikov – Deputy General Director for Investment Activity
 Oleg Yevtushenko – Executive Director
 Sergey Kulikov – Industrial Director of Electronics
 Anatoly Serdyukov – Industrial Director of Aviation
 Sergey Abramov – Industrial Director of Conventional Armament, Ammunition and Special Chemistry
 Viktor Kiryanov – Managing Director of Infrastructure Projects
 Vladimir Litvin – Managing Director of Direct Administration
 Maksim Vybornykh – State Secretary
 Alla Laletina – Head of Legal Department
 Yury Koptev – Chairman of the Scientific and Technical Council
 Natalya Borisova – Head of Bookkeeping and Fiscal Accounting

Scientific and Technical Council 

 Yury Koptev – Chairman of the Science and Engineering Board, Doctor of Technical Sciences
 Vladimir Verba – General Director, General Director of JSC Concern Vega, Doctor of Technical Sciences
 Valery Gheykin – Deputy General Director, General Director of JSC ODK, Doctor of Technical Sciences
 Vladimir Gutenev – First Deputy Chairman of the Industry Committee of the State Duma, First Vice-president of the Union of Machine Builders of Russia. Doctor of Technical Sciences
 Yury Demchenko – Chairman of the Science and Engineering Board, Chief Adviser of the General Director, Head of the Group of Advisers of Rosoboronexport
 Givi Dzhandzhgava – Deputy General Director of JSC KRET for on-board equipment R&D, General Designer, Doctor of Technical Sciences (until 2021)
 Nikolay Ivenev – Advisor to the General Director of JSC High-Precision Complexes on scientific and technical policy, Candidate of Technical Sciences
 Valery Kashin – Deputy General Director of JSC High-Precision Complexes – General Designer of JSC NPK KBM, Doctor of Technical Sciences
 Alexandr Komarov – Head of the Department of Coordination and R&D of JSC Russian Electronics, Candidate of Technical Sciences
 Aleksandr Kuznetsov – Director of the direction of science, engineering and innovative development of JSC Stankoprom, Doctor of Technical Sciences
 Alexandr Kulikov – Deputy General Director for Research of the Interdepartmental Center for Analytical Research in Chemistry, Physics and Biology under the Presidium RAS, Candidate of Technical Sciences
 Valery Litvinov – Chairman of Science and Engineering Board, Adviser to the General Director of JSC RT-Khimkompozit, Doctor of Technical Sciences
 Yury Maevsky – Deputy General Director of JSC KRET for radioelectronic combat equipment R&D, general designer of the radioelectronic combat system, Doctor of Technical Sciences
 Vladimir Tikhonov – First Deputy General Director of Techmash, Candidate of Technical Sciences
 Nikolay Turko – Senior Consultant of the General Director of Rostec, Doctor of Military Sciences
 Andrey Shibitov – Deputy General Director for Production of Russian Helicopters
 Anatoly Filachev – General Director of JSC Orion, Corresponding Member of RAS
 Viktor Shchitov – First Deputy General Director – Chief Engineer of TsNIITochMash, Doctor of Technical Sciences
 Grigory Elkin – First Deputy General Director of JSC OPK, General Designer of Automated Control and Communication Systems, Doctor of Economic Sciences

Social policy

Labor 
The companies controlled by Rostec employ about 450,000 people. A special focus of the corporation's responsibility on labor involves 21 dominant employers that are part of Rostec. As an example of corporate activity aimed at stabilization of social environment in one-company towns, mass media covered Rostec's labor policy in relation to AvtoVAZ, a dominant employer in Togliatti during the 2008-2009 economic crisis. Despite large-scale layoffs, public unrest was prevented by a special employment program for dismissed workers. The unemployment rate in the company town of Verkhnyaya Salda, Sverdlovsk Oblast, which is owned by VSMPO-AVISMA, is less than 1%.

Health 
In order to implement its Health National Program, the corporation has set up nine centers for high medical technologies. Five centers for cardiovascular surgery (Khabarovsk, Krasnoyarsk, Chelyabinsk, Perm and Kaliningrad), two centers for neurosurgery (Tyumen and Novosibirsk) and two centers for traumatic surgery, orthopedics and endoprosthesis replacement (Smolensk and Barnaul).

Rostec is a participant in the Perinatal center development program along with Russia's Ministry of Health, the Federal Compulsory Medical Insurance Fund and federal member state authorities.

As of March 2017, Rostec had built and equipped perinatal centers in 15 federal subjects of Russia:

 6 republics: Bashkortostan, Buryatia, Dagestan, Ingushetia, Karelia and Sakha (Yakutia);
 9 oblasts: Archangelsk, Bryansk, Leningrad, Orenburg, Penza, Pskov, Smolensk, Tambov and Ulyanovsk.

Education 
Rostec cooperates with 312 leading higher educational institutions, including, among others, Bauman Moscow State Technical University, and the Plekhanov Russian University of Economics, through targeted training of specialists, development of cooperation in the framework of scientific and technological areas, joint research, design and technological work. There are 294 departments belonging to holding companies and enterprises under Rostec in these institutions. In 2015, Rostec started 165 projects in collaboration with these institutions at a cost amounted to 2.8 billion rubles.

Sponsorship
On November 27, 2007, Rostec became general sponsor of FC Krylia Sovetov Samara; however, in 2011 the corporation decided to suspend its support of the team. In 2010 and 2011, Rostec sponsored Vitaly Petrov, Formula One racing driver. In 2012, Russian Helicopters partnered with Caterham F1Team for which Petrov drives. Improving professional training of the employees, Rostec cooperates with the WorldSkills movement. In 2015 the Corporation and WorldSkills Russia concluded a cooperation agreement which is aimed mainly at the joint work on training specialists for high-tech industries. State Corporation Rostec is a general partner of WorldSkills Russia in accordance with a three-year agreement.

Organization 

As of late 2016, going by its development strategy, Rostec organizes its 700 enterprises into either directly controlled companies or clusters composed of holding companies.

Aviation 

 United Aircraft Corporation: unites all the military and civil aviation designers and manufacturers of Russia
 Russian Helicopters
 Technodinamika: developer and manufacturer of aircraft equipment, including chassis, fuel systems, flight control systems and auxiliary power units;
 United Engine Corporation: engines for military and civil aviation and space exploration programs

Radioelectronics 

 Concern Radio-Electronic Technologies (KRET): military spec radio-electronic, state identification, aviation and radio-electronic equipment.
 RosEl
 Ruselectronics: electronic components, electronic devices and equipment, microwave equipment and semi-conductor devices;
 United Instrument Manufacturing Corporation: communications tools and systems, automated control systems, electronic security and robotic systems;
 Shvabe Holding: optical-electronic systems both for military and civil purposes;
 Concern Avtomatika: the largest enterprise of the Russian Federation concerned with problems of information security, with development and production of secrecy communication equipment and systems, protected information and tele-communication systems and also special automated control systems.

Armaments 

High Precision Systems (Vysokotochnye Kompleksy): weapons for the combat tactical zone;
Kalashnikov Concern: Russia's largest manufacturer of combat weapons.
Nacimbio: pharmaceutical holding for research and development of immune biological remedies.
RT-Auto: owns stakes in AvtoVAZ and Kamaz.
RT-Chemcomposite: specializes in innovative research and development in the field of polymer composite materials and integrated products for space exploration, aviation, arms and military equipment, ground and water transport, power utilities and other industries.
RT-Stankoprom: machine tool industry.
Security Technologies
Techmash: ammunition supplies for the Armed Forces.

Directly controlled companies 

 Rosoboronexport (arms export)
 VSMPO-AVISMA: produces 30% of the world's titanium.
 AvtoVAZ (car manufacturer, minority stake)
 Kamaz: leading Russian manufacturer of trucks.
 Uralvagonzavod: Russian manufacturer of armored fighting vehicle.
 RT-Invest (diversified, minority stake)
 RT-Business Development: charged with implementing the Rostec strategy aiming to increase capitalization of projects in the sectors of commercial advanced technologies, raw materials and associated infrastructure.
 Russia TEC (exhibition complex)
 National Ecological Operator (waste management)

Financial performance
The preliminary financial performance for 2012 show that the overall revenue of Rostec exceeded RUR960 billion compared with RUR817 billion a year earlier. Revenues from export to 70 countries globally exceeded RUR240 billion.

Main financial indicators, 2015 ($1 = 60,96 RUB):
 Consolidated revenue, $18.7 bln
 Consolidated net income, $1.62 bln
 Export revenues, $5.0 bln
 Total investments, $2.1 bln
 Exports of innovative products, $1.81 bln

See also
State-owned Assets Supervision and Administration Commission
List of companies of Russia
Almaz-Antey
Titan-Barrikady

References

External links
  

 
Technology companies of Russia
Companies based in Moscow
Russian state corporations
Russian companies established in 2007
Holding companies of Russia
Investment companies of Russia
Conglomerate companies of Russia
Holding companies established in 2007
Technology companies established in 2007
Russian entities subject to the U.S. Department of the Treasury sanctions